Sallanches is a commune in the Haute-Savoie department of France. Located close to the Mont Blanc massif, many visitors pass through the town en route to well-known alpine resorts such as Chamonix, Megève and Saint-Gervais-les-Bains.  Sallanches is also one of the towns in the Arve Valley, made popular by the presence of many high-tech industries. Over 300 retail stores are located in Sallanches, making the town a commercial hub. In 2018, the commune had a population of 16,508, and its urban area had 46,128 inhabitants.

In 2015 Sallanches hospital announced that, as part of the government's "groupements hospitaliers de territoire" policy, it would develop a specialist accident department to research and develop mountain-related emergency medicine, because of its proximity to, and past experience of, dealing with accidents occurring in the nearby high mountains. With an emergency team of 30 doctors and emergency staff, plus 50 support staff, it is expected that the new mountain medicine department will become a world-leader in developing treatments and researching into altitude sickness, frostbite, hypoxia, trauma-injuries and related sports medicine.

Geography 

Sallanches is a commune located in the far east of France in the historical region of Savoy. The town is located close to the Swiss and Italian borders.

Transport 
The commune has a railway station, on the La Roche-sur-Foron–Saint-Gervais-les-Bains-Le Fayet line.

Climate 
Sallanches features a warm-summer humid continental climate with no dry season.

The average annual rainfall is very high due to its location in the northwestern part of the Alps. Summers are warm to hot and stormy while winters are cold to very cold and snowy.

Population

Media
Sallanches is mentioned in American author Willa Cather's 1935 novel Lucy Gayheart.

Twin towns
 Spaichingen, Germany, since 1970

See also
Communes of the Haute-Savoie department
Sallanches Aerodrome

References

External links

 Official Sallanches website

Communes of Haute-Savoie